Tsangwo Monastery is a Buddhist monastery in Qinghai, China.

References

Buddhist monasteries in Qinghai
Tibetan Buddhist monasteries